The Kellner Family Foundation is a family foundation in the Czech Republic established by Petr Kellner and his wife Renáta Kellnerová in 2009. Between 2009 and 2021, the foundation disbursed over CZK 1.6 billion in support of educational activities in the Czech Republic.

History
The Foundation was established in 2009 and provided 9 million CZK to aid several municipalities after the floods of 2010. In 2011, the Foundation reported that it had been merged with the Educa foundation in 2011. According to media reports, the Foundation donated in total CZK 91 million during the year 2013. In 2014, the Foundation exceeded that amount by granting over CZK 97 million. In 2017, the Foundation donated almost CZK 88 million. In 2018, the Foundation donated CZK 88 million. In 2019, the Foundation donated CZK 89.5 million.

Description
The Kellner Family Foundation focuses its donations on measures to improve the quality of education at public primary school in the Czech Republic, namely through its Helping Schools Succeed project. It also supports financially disadvantaged students of the Open Gate grammar school in Babice, near Prague. The Foundation's "Universities" project also provides grants to Czech students to study at universities in the Czech Republic and abroad. The Foundation has also made generous donations to individuals and institutions working on projects focused on health, educational and cultural activities.

The Foundation channels its efforts into four major projects:
The "Open Gate" project supports academically-gifted children from foster homes, broken families or otherwise challenging socio-economic environments by providing them with education and accommodation at the eight-year grammar school of the same name. Since the school's establishment in 2005, about one-half of its students have received full or partial grants from the Foundation. The Foundation grants around CZK 40 million annually. Hundreds of students have studied or continue to study at the Open Gate School thanks to grants from The Kellner Family Foundation. To date, 442 students have benefited from grants exceeding a total of CZK 615 million.
Similar to Open Gate is the “Universities” project that grants money for school fees, travel costs and living expenses to talented students so that they can study at universities abroad and in the Czech Republic. Thanks to these grants, around 50 students leave the country to study abroad, or get support to enroll at Czech universities and other higher education institutions annually. In the academic year 2012/2013 the group of 50 students has been granted funds. In the academic year 2014/2015 the grants have been provided to the group of 57 students. In the academic year 2019/2020 the grants have been provided to the group of 61 students.
Helping Schools Succeed is a project that provides selected elementary schools with funds to improve the qualifications of their teachers and principals. The Foundation currently works with more than 860 teachers and, through them, supports more than 9,500 students.
The Science project supported the work of Czech oncology researchers. Multi-year grants were allocated to exceptional scientists with successful international backgrounds and also to talented researchers who had just started their careers, including fresh graduates from medical or natural science faculties. In 2013, the first three research groups received grants for 4–5 years whose overall sum totalled CZK 8.5m. Within the next five years, the Foundation was projected to provide around CZK 38m in grants and financial support. To date, grants have been given to three teams of researchers. One team, led by Jan Brábek from Charles University’s Faculty of Science in on the Analysis of the Plasticity of Cancer Cell Invasiveness. The other two teams are led by Jaroslav Truksa from the Institute of Biotechnology of the Czech Academy of Sciences in Prague, and Jiří Bartek, who heads a laboratory at the Danish Cancer Society Research Center in Copenhagen, Denmark.

References

External links 

 Official website The Kellner Family Foundation
 Official website Open Gate - Grammar and Primary School

Foundations based in the Czech Republic
Organizations established in 2009
2009 establishments in the Czech Republic